Diabetes UK is a British-based patient, healthcare professional and research charity that has been described as "one of the foremost diabetes charities in the UK". The charity campaigns for improvements in the care and treatment of people with diabetes.

History
Diabetes UK was founded in 1934 as The Diabetic Association, by the author H. G. Wells and Robert Daniel Lawrence. Diabetes UK's first research grant was made in 1936. The organisation has since had two name changes—in 1954 to The British Diabetic Association and again in  June 2000 to Diabetes UK.

Both founders were living with diabetes, and their aim was to make sure that everyone in the UK had access to insulin, regardless of their financial situation.

In 1999, the charity reviewed its services for people in their 20s to 40s, hoping to get more of that age group involved; at the time, 70% of younger people with diabetes were members but only 5% of people aged 20–40 with diabetes.

As of 2010, the charity's yearly income was £29,334,000.

Services

Research
Diabetes UK provides funding for United Kingdom-based research into the causes and treatment of diabetes and its complications.

The charity's first research grant was made in 1936, which lead to a major discover in how the liver produces glucose.

The charity provides financial support for "project grants, funding to purchase laboratory equipment, and research-training opportunities ranging from PhD studentships to research fellowships." The research they fund covers all areas of diabetes, and there have been significant breakthroughs for both Type 1 treatment and Type 2 prevention and remission. They continue to invest more in research in the hope that, one day, they will find a cure.

In 2011, the charity awarded £1,035,743 to five new research grants, and £440,051 to five new PhD studentships.

In 2017, they invested over £6.7 million in diabetes research and agreed to support 38 new studies.

Campaigns 
Diabetes UK are at the forefront of the fight against diabetes. With the help of their supporters, they've run campaigns like the 4Ts to help raise awareness of the symptoms of Type 1 diabetes, made sure children get the care they need in schools with their Make the Grade campaign, fight for equality of care and treatment across the UK with their Flash campaign and are working to make the healthy choice the easy choice with their food labeling campaign.

Partnership 
Diabetes UK work with a range of companies, trusts, foundations and philanthropists to help fund research breakthroughs and prevent Type 2 diabetes.

In 2018, Diabetes UK began a new five-year strategic partnership with long-standing partner Tesco, alongside British Heart Foundation and Cancer Research UK, to tackle the UK's biggest health challenges through behaviour change.

Groups and Events

Diabetes UK's first local voluntary group was set up in 1939. There are now 330 groups across the UK.

The organization also works with the Council for People Living with Diabetes and the Council of Healthcare Professionals.

Conferences

The society runs conferences for people with diabetes, volunteers and healthcare professionals.

Telephone support services and helpline

In 1993, the organisation launched an information line for patients, family and friends.

Diabetes UK helpline is open Monday to Friday between 9am and 6pm. And there is an online forum that offers support day and night from others affected by diabetes to offer support and advice.

Holidays

The charity has been providing holidays for children since the 1930s. Family and adult holidays have been introduced since.

Publications
Diabetes UK produces a range of information leaflets and booklets that help raise awareness of diabetes, and offer support and knowledge to help in prevention of Type 2 and management of all types of diabetes.

These include the magazine "Balance"  (formerly The Diabetic Journal), first published in 1935, changing its name to Balance in 1961, and "Diabetes Update" for professionals.

Via John Wiley and Sons, Diabetes UK produces the academic journal, Diabetic Medicine.

The charity has also published practice guidelines for professionals.

Website 
Diabetes UK website links people to clear information available for anyone who needs it. This includes healthcare professionals, parents, carers, and people living with diabetes. Their Learning Zone is an area where through sign up, people can gain access to personalised support and tips in diabetes management from peers.

Since 14 November 2008, the Diabetes UK site has hosted a forum. This was originally under the URL diabetessupport.co.uk. On the 13th of October 2015, the forum had a major makeover to make clear the DUK connection; this involved moving to a new URL (the DUK URL prefixed with "forum"), changing the board logo (including favicon) and colour scheme to match the main site, and upgrading to new forum software.

See also
 Diabetes
Juvenile Diabetes Research Fund 
 American Diabetes Association

References

Further reading
 Article on Diabetes UK in The International Review of Patient Care

External links
 Official website

Diabetes organizations
Health charities in the United Kingdom
Organisations based in the London Borough of Tower Hamlets
Organizations established in 1934
Whitechapel
1934 establishments in the United Kingdom